Gustave "Gus" Fitzhugh Touchard Jr. (or Gustav) (January 11, 1888 – September 5, 1918) was an American tennis player in the early part of the 20th century. He was ranked as high as No. 4 in the United States during his career.

Personal life
He was born in New York on January 11, 1888.

In July 1915, Touchard confessed to a charge of stealing 24 dozen golf balls from the sporting goods store where he was employed.

He joined the Royal Flying Corps Canada at Camp Borden after having been turned down by the United States aviation corps. He died in 1918 in Toronto General Hospital of a throat operation.

Tennis career
At the US Nationals, Touchard paired with Raymond D. Little to win the 1911 doubles title and reach the 1912 doubles final.

At the tournament now known as the Cincinnati Masters, Touchard won the 1912 singles title over Richard H. Palmer. He reached the singles final in 1913, losing to William S. McEllroy.

He won the U.S. National Indoor Tennis Championships title three consecutive years (1913, 1914 and 1915) and won the singles title at the New Jersey state championship in 1915. In 1912, he reached the final of the US Clay Court Championship, losing to Richard Norris Williams.

Grand Slam tournament performance timeline

Grand Slam finals

Doubles (1 title)

References

External links

American male tennis players
Tennis people from New York (state)
United States National champions (tennis)
1888 births
1918 deaths
Grand Slam (tennis) champions in men's doubles
Royal Air Force personnel of World War I
Royal Air Force officers
British military personnel killed in World War I